Trombipulation is the ninth album by the funk band Parliament (see 1980 in music). It was released by Casablanca Records. It was the last album of original material produced by the group for 38 years until Medicaid Fraud Dogg in 2018. Unlike previous Parliament albums, George Clinton did not serve as sole producer of the album, as other P-Funk figures assisted in producing individual tracks. Bassist Bootsy Collins emerged as the principal musician on this album, playing virtually all of the instruments on a number of tracks.  The track "Let's Play House" was sampled by the Hip-Hop group Digital Underground for their single "The Humpty Dance".

While Trombipulation wasn't as commercially successful as previous Parliament albums, its first single,  "Agony of DeFeet" peaked at number 7 on the Billboard Hot R&B/Hip-Hop Songs charts.

Track listing
 "Crush It" (G. Clinton, W. Collins) – 3:51 
 "Trombipulation" (G. Clinton, W. Collins) – 4:34
 "Long Way Around" (G. Clinton, W. Morrison) – 5:40
"Agony of Defeet" (R. Dunbar, D. Sterling, G. Clinton) – 6:23 
"New Doo Review" (G. Clinton, R. Ford) – 5:55
"Let's Play House" (G. Clinton, W. Collins, W. Morrison) – 3:39
"Body Language" (G. Clinton) – 5:57 
"Peek-a-Groove" (G. Clinton, R. Ford) – 7:48

Personnel
Bass: Bootsy Collins, Donnie Sterling, Lige Curry, Jimmie Ali
Guitars: Bootsy Collins, Tony Thomas, Michael Hampton, Gordon Carlton, Jerome Ali
Drums: Bootsy Collins, Lonnie Greene, Tyrone Lampkin, Kenny Colton
Keyboards: Bernie Worrell, David Lee Chong, Michael Hampton, Manon Saulsby, Ernestro Wilson
Horns: Fred Wesley, Larry Hatcher, Bennie Cowan, Greg Thomas, Maceo Parker, Richard Griffith, Darryl Dixon, David Taylor, Barry Taylor, Barry Rogers, Danny Cahn, David Tofani, John Mical, David Majali, Randy Brecker, Michael Brecker
Vocals: Dr. Funk, Garry Shider, Ray Davis, Michael "Clip" Payne, Lige Curry, Jerome Rodgers, Larry Hatcher, Robert Johnson, Ron Dunbar, Jeanette McGruder, Dawn Silva, Sheila Horne, Mallia Franklin, Shirley Hayden, Janice Evans, Jeanette Washington, Gwen Dozier, Cheryl James, Ron Ford, Patty Walker, Andre Williams, Stevie Pannell, Kevin Shider, Tracey "Trey Lewd" Lewis, Tony Davis, Philippe Wynne, Jessica Cleaves, Donnie Sterling, Tony Thomas, Lonnie Greene, Nina Hoover, Linda Shider, Larry Heckstall, Dawn Driver, Ronni Faust, Godmoma, Junie Morrison, Bootsy Collins.

References

External links
 

Parliament (band) albums
1980 albums
Casablanca Records albums
Concept albums